Strigoderma pimalis is a species of shining leaf chafer in the family Scarabaeidae.

References

Further reading

 
 

Rutelinae
Beetles described in 1884